Amorn Yuktanandana (born 16 June 1928, died before 2016) was a Thai sports shooter. He competed at the 1960, 1964, 1968 Summer Olympics and 1958 and 1966 Asian Games.

References

External links
 

1928 births
Year of death missing
Amorn Yuktanandana
Amorn Yuktanandana
Shooters at the 1960 Summer Olympics
Shooters at the 1964 Summer Olympics
Shooters at the 1968 Summer Olympics
Asian Games medalists in shooting
Shooters at the 1958 Asian Games
Shooters at the 1966 Asian Games
Amorn Yuktanandana
Medalists at the 1958 Asian Games
Medalists at the 1966 Asian Games
Amorn Yuktanandana